Garber House may refer to:

 Garber House (Los Angeles, California), a Los Angeles Historic-Cultural Monument
 Garber House (Goshen, New Hampshire), listed on the National Register of Historic Places in Sullivan County, New Hampshire
 Garber House (Woodinville, Washington), located at the highest point in King County, Washington